Kannivadi is a panchayat town in Tiruppur district in the Indian state of Tamil Nadu. It was a part of the Erode District in the past. It is bordered between Karur district and Dharapuram town.

Demographics
 India census, Kannivadi had a population of 4249. Males constitute 50% of the population and females 50%. Kannivadi has an average literacy rate of 63%, higher than the national average of 59.5%: male literacy is 76%, and female literacy is 49%. In Kannivadi, 7% of the population is under 6 years of age.

References

Cities and towns in Tiruppur district